Tobe Sexton (born September 6, 1968) is an American actor and producer.

Sexton was born in Fort Worth, Texas, he studied acting and directing for theatre as well as film at The California Institute of the Arts from which he earned a BFA. He appeared as a teenage Freddy Krueger in Freddy's Dead: The Final Nightmare.

In 1995 Sexton co-founded the Bauhaus Film Group.  Around 2000 he moved underground to Indie film and created The TCS or The Technological City State, Productions. Affiliates include The International High IQ Society, Mandalay Entertainment, Apogee Magic, the Entertainment Technology Center-USC as well as several indie production companies and filmmakers.

Sexton produced the feature The Metrosexual.

Filmography

External links

 Tobe Sexton Starts the Actors Colony, article featured in The Beach Reporter

1968 births
American male film actors
Film producers from Texas
Living people
Male actors from Fort Worth, Texas